Tomišelj is a village in the Municipality of Ig in central Slovenia, on the edge of the marshland south of the capital Ljubljana. The municipality is part of the traditional region of Inner Carniola and is now included in the Central Slovenia Statistical Region.

Name
Tomišelj was attested in written records in 1397 and 1436 as Domischel (and as Thomuschl in 1415 and Tomischel in 1468). The name was nominalized from an adjective form of a hypocorism, which would have been *Tomisel, and the name therefore means 'Tomisel's village'. In the past the German name was Tomischl.

Church

The local parish church is dedicated to Our Lady of the Rosary and belongs to the Roman Catholic Archdiocese of Ljubljana.

References

External links

Tomišelj on Geopedia
Tomišelj Volunteer Fire Department 
Tomišelj Cemetery

Populated places in the Municipality of Ig